Qalandar Ibad (ډاکټر قلندر عباد) (born; 1980) is an Afghan physician and the current acting Minister of Public Health of Afghanistan since 21 September 2021.

Ibad was born in 1980 in Marzak village, Sar Hawza District of Paktika province. He received his primary education in Peshawar, Pakistan. He received his medical degree (MD) from the Faculty of Medicine of Nangarhar University, and master’s in Urology from Pakistan Institute of Medical Sciences, Islamabad.

References

1980 births
Living people
Taliban government ministers of Afghanistan
Place of birth missing (living people)
Afghan physicians
Public health ministers
Nangarhar University alumni
Afghan expatriates in Pakistan